Time Traveller is the fourth album by drummer Keith LeBlanc, released in September 1992 by Blanc Records.

Track listing

Personnel 

Musicians
Willy B. – vocals (A2)
Craig Derry – vocals (13)
Kenji Jammer – guitar (A2-A4, A7, B2, B3)
Keith LeBlanc – drums, drum programming, percussion, keyboards, effects, bass guitar, trumpet, editing, producer, engineering, mixing
Skip McDonald – guitar (A5, B1-B3, 13, 14)
Style Scott – percussion (A7)
Bim Sherman – vocals (A9)
Tim Simenon – turntables (A2-A8)
Talvin Singh – tabla (A4, A9, B2), percussion (15)
Doug Wimbish – bass guitar (B1-B3, 13, 14)
Egon Zo – effects (B2)

Technical personnel
Harvey Birrell – engineering, mixing (A9, B1-B3, 14, 15)
Tom Lord-Alge – engineering
Kevin Metcalfe – mastering
Dave Pine – engineering
John Smith – engineering

Release history

References

External links 
 

1992 albums
Keith LeBlanc albums
Albums produced by Keith LeBlanc